Ballingarry GAA club is a Gaelic Athletic Association club located in Ballingarry, south County Tipperary, Ireland. The club plays hurling in Tipperary GAA competitions.

History

Honours
Junior B All Ireland Club Hurling Championship (1)
 2007
Tipperary Intermediate Hurling Championship (1)
 1979
South Tipperary Senior Hurling Championship (8)
 1949, 1980, 1987, 1992, 1994, 1996, 1998, 2001
South Tipperary Intermediate Hurling Championship (4)
 1971, 1973, 1977, 1979, 2021
Tipperary Junior A Hurling Championship (1)
 1973
South Tipperary Junior Hurling Championship (8)
 1935, 1939, 1944, 1947, 1966, 1970, 1986, 2008
Tipperary Junior Football Championship (1)
 1939
South Tipperary Junior Football Championship (8)
 1939, 1945, 1947, 1996, 2013, 2014, 2015, 2022
Tipperary Junior B Hurling Championship (1)
 2007
South Tipperary Junior B Hurling Championship (1)
 2007
South Tipperary Under-21 'A' Hurling Championship (10)
 1970, 1975, 1981, 1990, 1991, 1997 (as Ballingarry Gaels), 1998 (as Ballingarry Gaels), 2010, 2011, 2019
County Tipperary Minor Hurling Championship (2)
 1994, 1995 (both as Ballingarry Gaels)
South Tipperary Minor Hurling Championship (14)
 1938, 1960 (with Mullinahone), 1962 (with Mullinahone), 1963 (with Mullinahone),1972, 1978, 1979, 1994 (as Ballingarry Gaels), 1995 (as Ballingarry Gaels), 1997, 1998 (as Ballingarry Gaels), 2006, 2007, 2008
Tipperary Minor B Hurling Championship (1)
 1992
 South Tipperary Minor Hurling Championship (2)
 1992, 2014

Camogie
St Patrick's Camogie Club was founded in 1964 when Ballingarry and Glengoole amalgamated. They went on to win two All-Ireland and three county championships and supplied six of the 12 players on the Tipperary team for the 1965 All-Ireland final.

Alice Graham, Statia Dunne, Annie Langton and Ann Carroll were the first officers of the club. Following victory in 1966, the club disbanded and the players returned to their original clubs.

Honours
All-Ireland Senior Club Camogie Championship (2)
1965, 1966Tipperary Senior Camogie Championship''' (3)
1964, 1965, 1966

Notable players
Ann Carroll, Tipperary, Kilkenny, Munster and Leinster player

References

External links
Tipperary GAA site
Official Ballingarry GAA Club website

Hurling clubs in County Tipperary
Gaelic football clubs in County Tipperary
Gaelic games clubs in County Tipperary